The IPT-7 Junior was a light aircraft manufactured by the Brazilian Instituto de Pesquisas Tecnologicas (IPT).

Design and development
Frederico A. Brotero, a chief-engineer at the Instituto de Pesquisas Tecnologicas, designed a light multirole aircraft that first flew in 1945. The IPT-7 was designed as a low-wing monoplane with fixed tailwheel landing gear and had a conventional tailplane. The fuselage and wings were of freijó wooden construction, which was planked with plywood made from domestic timbers. The pilot and passenger sat side by side in the cockpit, which could be entered through a sliding canopy. The aircraft was powered by a Franklin 4AC with 48 kW. Despite good flight characteristics, no series production took place.

Specifications

See also

 CAP-5 Carioca
 CNNA HL-6
 IMPA Tu-Sa

References

Single-engined tractor aircraft
Low-wing aircraft
1940s Brazilian civil aircraft
1940s Brazilian experimental aircraft
Aircraft first flown in 1945